Hkun Law (also spelled Khun Law; also Binnya Khon-Law; 1254–1311) was king of Martaban from 1307 to 1311. He succeeded the throne after the death of his brother Wareru, who left no male heir.

Though Law gained the recognition of Martaban's overlord Sukhothai, he could not establish any control beyond the capital Martaban (Mottama). He was powerless to defend the Sittaung valley from raids by the Lan Na kingdom. His nominal vassals ruled like sovereigns. In 1311, he was assassinated by the troops of his brother-in-law Gov. Min Bala of Myaungmya, who placed his son (and Law's nephew) Saw O on the throne.

Most of the monarchs of the Wareru dynasty that ruled the Mon-speaking Lower Burma until the mid-16th century were descended from Law.

Early life
The future king was born Ma Gada in Donwun on 27 March 1254. Gada had two siblings, an elder brother Ma Gadu and a younger sister Hnin U Yaing. They were of Shan and/or Mon background.

Gada later became heir-presumptive of the polity that his brother founded in 1287. That year, Gadu, styled as Wareru, declared independence from the collapsing Pagan Empire. He later expanded his reach into Pegu and the Irrawaddy delta, consolidating three Mon-speaking provinces of Lower Burma into a polity, successfully fighting off Pagan's attempt to retake Lower Burma in 1295–96. However, Gada's role was likely minimal as he is not mentioned in the chronicles at all during his brother's reign. At any rate, Gada was the heir presumptive as Wareru did not have a male heir. Indeed he succeeded the Martaban throne in 1307 when King Wareru was assassinated by the king's two grandsons.

Reign
His first act as king was to seek his overlord king of Sukhothai's recognition. (Wareru had sought and received Sukhothai's support in exchange for nominal vassalage at least since 1293, and had been a Mongol vassal since 1298.) The king of Sukhothai recognized Gada as the rightful successor, and gave him the title of Saw Ran Parakut. The new vassal king was also now known as Hkun Law, or Binnya Khon Law.

Despite Sukhothai's support, Law was not respected by his vassals or neighbors. Within the first year of his reign, Lan Na raided deep into Martaban territory, reaching as far south as Donwun. The raid killed Gov. Nyi Yan Maw-La-Mon of Donwun, whom Law had just appointed. The new king's inability to organize an effective defense against the raid further weakened support among his restive nominal vassals. Indeed, Law's brother-in-law Gov. Min Bala of Myaungmya practically ruled the Irrawaddy delta like a sovereign. Over the next three years, Law's performance did not improve. Bala became further emboldened, and began eyeing the Martaban throne itself.

In March 1311, Bala and Hnin U Yaing seized the Martaban throne while Law was on an elephant hunting trip near Moulmein (Mawlamyaing). Law found out about the coup only upon his return from the hunting trip when he found the capital's gates firmly shut. He tried to flee to the nearby woods, but Bala's troops chased him and killed him there.

The throne was vacant for at least two weeks. Bala initially thought about taking over the throne himself but yielded to his wife's demand that their eldest son Saw O succeed instead. Saw O became king on 10 April 1311.

Legacy
His legacy was his progeny. Although Hkun Law was not an effective ruler, all of the monarchs of the Wareru dynasty that ruled Lower Burma from 1330 until the mid-16th century—i.e. Binnya E Law (r. 1330–1348) onwards except Dhammazedi (r. 1471–1492)—were his direct descendants.

Notes

References

Bibliography
 
 
 
 
 
 
 
 

Hanthawaddy dynasty
1311 deaths
1254 births
14th-century Burmese monarchs